Buddhist Mau Fung Memorial College is a co-ed Hong Kong secondary school located in Tin Shui Wai, New Territories. It uses Chinese as the medium of instruction for all subjects except English class.

Notable alumni
 Tony Chung – activist

See also
 List of secondary schools in Hong Kong

References

External links
 

Secondary schools in Hong Kong
Tin Shui Wai